Fabian de Keijzer (born 10 May 2000) is a Dutch football player. He plays as a goalkeeper for FC Utrecht.

Club career
He made his Eerste Divisie debut for Jong FC Utrecht on 3 December 2018 in a game against Den Bosch, as a starter. He was reported to become the senior Utrecht side's first goalkeeper in January 2022. He made his Eredivisie debut for the senior side on 16 January 2022 against Ajax. He remained Utrecht's starting goalkeeper for the remainder of the 2021–22 season. In the 2022–23 season, de Keijzer moved to the bench again with the transfer of Vasilis Barkas.

International
He was part of the squad for Netherlands U17 at the 2017 UEFA European Under-17 Championship, but did not play any games at the tournament, serving as backup to Jasper Schendelaar.

References

External links
 

2000 births
People from Leusden
Footballers from Utrecht (province)
Living people
Dutch footballers
Netherlands youth international footballers
Netherlands under-21 international footballers
Association football goalkeepers
Jong FC Utrecht players
FC Utrecht players
Eerste Divisie players
Eredivisie players